The Biblical and Pentecostal College of Puerto Rico is a private, Christian, Evangelical, Pentecostal, and coeducational university in Trujillo Alto, Puerto Rico that offers undergraduate and graduate studies in pastoral studies, biblical interpretation, Christian education, and theology. The university is accredited by the Caribbean Evangelical Theological Association (CETA) and The Association for Biblical Higher Education (ABHE).

Dean 
Prof. Jennifer Contreras

External links

Official website in Spanish

Association for Biblical Higher Education
Universities and colleges in Puerto Rico
Evangelical seminaries and theological colleges